= Sunningdale Ridge =

- Location within Gauteng Location within South Africa
- Coordinates: 26.134°S 28.108°E
- Country: South Africa
- Province: Gauteng
- Municipality: City of Johannesburg
- Main Place: Johannesburg

Area
  - Total: 0.39 km^{2} (0.15 sq mi)

Population (2011)
  - Total: 1,012
  - Density: 2,600/km^{2} (6,700/sq mi)

Racial makeup (2011)
  - Black African: 16.4%
  - Coloured: 1.1%
  - Indian/Asian: 1.9%
  - White: 80.4%
  - Other: 0.2%

First languages (2011)
  - English: 78.4%
  - Zulu: 4.4%
  - Tswana: 3.9%
  - Afrikaans: 3.7%
  - Other: 9.5%
- Time zone: UTC+2 (SAST)
- Postal code (street): 2192

Sunningdale Ridge is a suburb of Johannesburg, South Africa. It is located in Region E of the City of Johannesburg Metropolitan Municipality.
